Makan (  (English: Home a Heaven) is a Pakistani TV Drama Series, which was broadcast on GEO TV. The serial is directed by Kamran Qureshi, written by Bushra Ansari and produced by Humayun Saeed and Abdullah Kadwani's production house 7th Sky Entertainment. The story based on extramarital affairs, the dignity of family relations and has the essence of the realities of life.

The show was also aired on Star Plus Russia

Plot
The story revolves around a rich family of two brothers Nawaz (Khayyam Sarhadi) and Shehbaz (Shabbir Jan) who own a Cinema House. Nawaz is married with a rich lady Bhabi G also known as Tayee G (Bushra Ansari) who is dominant and rules over the whole family members while Shehbaz is married with a typical eastern woman Mehru (Shagufta Ejaz) who is very obedient of her husband and in-laws.

Nawaz has two children, Zahra (Ayesha Sana) and Akbar Shahood Alvi. Naheed (Maira Khan) who loves Akbar commit suicide after being refused by his mother Bhabi G to marry Akbar.

Shehbaz often snubs his own wife and children, Jaffer (Saleem Sheikh), Gulfam (Fahad Mustafa) and Seema (Saira Khan) because of his Bhabi G to whom he is always faithful whether it's a right decision or wrong.

Shehbaz hides his divorce from family and is living with wife for twelve years. Nawaz's wife (Bhabi G) had relationships outside of marriage with her brother in-law Shehbaz.

Jaffer gets job in bank and he moves to his new house provided by bank. He helps Saima (Naheed Shabbir) from ex-husband's blackmailing and later marries to her.

Zahra has two kids from her husband Azam (Kaiser Khan Nizamani) but not getting enough attention from him, she is having affair with her friend's husband Shahid (Jahanzeb Gurchani).

Ghulfam marries to film actress Nazli (Sara Loren) and takes power of attorney for all property from Bhabi G by doing fraud and transfers all property papers in his wife's name. Nazli and his malicious father takes over all the business from Nawaz, who can't absorb the shock and dies in Heartattach. Bhabi G gets paralyzed by pushing her down the stairs by Nazli and his father. Later Nazli's father gets arrested in involvement of Bhabi G's only son Akbar's (Shahood Alvi) murder.

Cast

Main cast
Sara Loren as Nazli
Fahad Mustafa as Gulfam
Bushra Ansari as Tayee G
Saleem Sheikh as Jaffer
Shagufta Ejaz as Mehru
Khayyam Sarhadi as Nawaz Ali
Shabbir Jan as Shahbaz Ali 
Ayesha Sana as Zahra
Shahood Alvi as Akbar
Saira Khan as Seema

Recurring cast
Maira Khan as Naheed
Rashid Farooqi as Faizan
Jahanzeb Gurchani as Shahid
Kaiser Khan Nizamani as Azam
Naheed Shabbir as Saima 
Adnan Jilani as Anees
Ehtasham Warsi as Nazli's Dad
Mubasshir Abbas as Dilawar
Parveen Akbar as Saima's Mum
Tasneem Ansari as Akbar's Professor
Aiman as Sumbul
Rehana Akhtar as Naheed's Mum
Gaysoo as Pino
Imtiaz Taj as Journalist
Ayaz Khan as TV Director
Adnan Shah as Jaffer's Friend

Soundtrack

The theme song Rog Jog was composed by Waqar Ali and sung by Shafqat Amanat Ali. Lyricist  was M Nasir and music video was released in 2006.

Awards and nominations
6th Lux Style Awards 
Nominated - Best TV Director (Satellite) (2007) - Kamran Qureshi.

See also
Moorat
Riyasat
Manzil
Sarkar Sahab
Ishq Ki Inteha
Choti Si Kahani

References

External links

Geo TV original programming
Pakistani drama television series
Urdu-language television shows
Television shows set in Karachi